2018 Nadeshiko League Cup Final was the 11th final of the Nadeshiko League Cup competition. The final was played at Nishigaoka Soccer Stadium in Tokyo on July 21, 2018. Nippon TV Beleza won the championship.

Overview
Nippon TV Beleza won their 7th title, by defeating INAC Kobe Leonessa 1–0 with Mina Tanaka goal.

Match details

See also
2018 Nadeshiko League Cup

References

Nadeshiko League Cup
2018 in Japanese women's football